Photinia villosa is a species in the flowering plant family Rosaceae, with common names Christmas berry and oriental photinia. This plant was recently introduced into the United States, likely as a landscaping or garden plant. It has escaped cultivation and has become increasingly invasive in northern New Jersey, eastern Pennsylvania, and parts of Virginia, New York and Connecticut.

Varieties 
 Photinia villosa var. coreana (Decne.) Rehder — Korean photinia 
 Photinia villosa var. laevis (Thunb.) Dippel — smooth oriental photinia 
 Photinia villosa var. sinica Rehder & E.H.Wilson

References

villosa